The 15th Writers Guild of America Awards honored the best film writers and television writers of 1962. Winners were announced in 1963.

Winners & Nominees

Film
Winners are listed first highlighted in boldface.

Television

Special Awards

References

External links 

 WGA.org

1962
W
Writers Guild of America Awards
Writers Guild of America Awards
Writers Guild of America Awards
Writers Guild of America Awards